Baharabad (also Romanized as Bahārābād) is a village in Chahriq Rural District, Kuhsar District, Salmas County, West Azerbaijan Province, Iran. At the 2006 census, its population was 80, in 15 families.

References 

Populated places in Salmas County